Responsible gambling awareness week is held annually in May and focuses on the promotion of responsible gambling and services that assist people with problem gambling issues throughout Australia.

Events
Events for the week are typically organised at a local level and have been hosted and supported by local gambling venues, local councils, problem gambling services, local libraries and educational institutes. which can include morning tea, lunch, talks from gambling help agencies and former gamblers, giveaways and displays in public spaces.

Partners
A steering committee made up of members of the following organisations helps to guide and support Responsible Gambling Awareness Week:
Australian Leisure and Hospitality Group
Community Clubs Association of Victoria
Crown Melbourne
Ethnic Communities Council of Victoria
Gambler's Help Services
Interchurch Gambling Taskforce
Primary Care Partnerships
Tabcorp
Tatts Group
Turning Point Alcohol and Drug Centre
United Voice
Victorian Commission for Liquor and Gambling Regulation
VicHealth
Victorian Local Governance Association
Victorian Responsible Gambling Foundation

Partners of the Victorian Responsible Gambling Foundation:
AFL Victoria
Collingwood Football Club
Melbourne Victory Football Club
Netball Victoria
Kangaroos South Melbourne Football Club

Responsible Gambling Awareness Week supporters:
Australian Human Resources Institute
Australian Institute of Family Studies
Racing Victoria

Criticism
Responsible Gambling Awareness Week has received criticism for being a way to deflect attention from the more pressing issues within the gambling industry such as the amount of revenue generated from Poker machines. Both Tim Costello, Chairman for the National Churches Gambling Taskforce, and Dr Charles Livingstone, Senior Lecturer in the School of Public Health and Preventive Medicine at Monash University have criticised the week for involving rather than opposing the gambling industry. In 2013, Dr Livingstone pointed out that Responsible Gambling Awareness Week website had provided links that took a user directly to the websites for TabCorp,  Tatts Group and Crown Casino.

References

External links
Sports Toto
Topical Sport

Gambling and society
Gambling in Australia